W Taipei is a five-star luxury hotel located in Taipei, Taiwan and owned by Taiwanese retail conglomerate Uni-president. It occupies the 8th to 31st floors of the Taipei City Hall Bus Station offering a total of 405 guest rooms. It started trial operations in February 2011, and official operations in March 2011.

Location
W Taipei is located in Xinyi Planning District, the central business district of Taipei and close to venues and tourist attractions such as the Taipei World Trade Center, Taipei International Convention Center, Taipei City Hall, National Sun Yat-sen Memorial Hall and Taipei 101.

Facilities
W Taipei offers two restaurants, a pool bar, and a cocktail lounge, including the classic The Kitchen Table located on the 10th-storey and a Chinese restaurant Yen located on the top floor of the building. Other facilities include the WET Pool, WOOBAR, the AWAY Spa, FIT fitness center and WIRED business center. The exterior was designed by Japanese designer Tadashi Yamane while the interior was designed by GA Design. Other facilities include the WET Bar and WET outdoor pool, located on the 10th floor, which overlooks Taipei 101 and the skyline of the cosmopolitan downtown. The hotel has five restaurants and bars.

Restaurants & Bars 
 The Kitchen Table
 WOOBAR
 Yen
 WET Bar

Gallery

See also
 W Hotels
 Marriott International
 Taipei City Hall Bus Station
 Uni-President Enterprises Corporation

References

External links

 

Hotel buildings completed in 2010
Xinyi Special District
Taipei
2011 establishments in Taiwan
Hotels established in 2011
Skyscraper hotels in Taipei